The white-breasted cuckooshrike (Ceblepyris pectoralis) is a species of bird in the family Campephagidae.
It is found in Angola, Benin, Botswana, Burkina Faso, Burundi, Cameroon, Central African Republic, Democratic Republic of the Congo, Ivory Coast, Eswatini, Ethiopia, Gambia, Ghana, Guinea, Guinea-Bissau, Kenya, Malawi, Mali, Mauritania, Mozambique, Namibia, Nigeria, Rwanda, Senegal, Sierra Leone, South Africa, Sudan, Tanzania, Togo, Uganda, Zambia, and Zimbabwe.
Its natural habitats are subtropical or tropical dry forest and dry savanna.

References

External links
 White-breasted cuckooshrike - Species text in The Atlas of Southern African Birds.

white-breasted cuckooshrike
Birds of Sub-Saharan Africa
white-breasted cuckooshrike
Taxonomy articles created by Polbot